This is a list of German television related events from 1964.

Events
11 January - Nora Nova is selected to represent Germany at the 1964 Eurovision Song Contest with her song "Man gewöhnt sich so schnell an das Schöne". She is selected to be the ninth German Eurovision entry during Ein Lied für Kopenhagen held at the HR Studios in Frankfurt.

Debuts

ZDF
 6 July – Slim Callaghan Intervenes

Television shows

1950s
Tagesschau (1952–present)

1960s
 heute (1963-present)

Ending this year

Births
9 December - Hape Kerkeling, comedian, author, TV host, actor, singer & voice actor

Deaths